Miry Creek is a  long 4th order tributary to the Dan River in Halifax County, Virginia.

Course 
Miry Creek rises in a pond about 2.5 miles east of Vernon Hill, Virginia, and then flows generally southeast to join the Dan River about 3 miles west-southwest of South Boston.

Watershed 
Miry Creek drains  of area, receives about 45.5 in/year of precipitation, has a wetness index of 393.93, and is about 54% forested.

See also 
 List of Virginia Rivers

References 

Rivers of Virginia
Rivers of Halifax County, Virginia
Tributaries of the Roanoke River